Köryədi (also, Këryadi, Kër”yadi, and Kergyady) is a village and municipality in the Yardymli Rayon of Azerbaijan.  It has a population of 1,360.

References 

Populated places in Yardimli District